Comitas terrisae is an extinct species of sea snail, a marine gastropod mollusc in the family Pseudomelatomidae, the turrids and allies.

Description
The length of the shell attains 20.5 mm, its diameter 7.5 mm.

Distribution
This extinct species is endemic to New Zealand. Fossils were found in Tertiary strata of Southeast Wairarapa

References

 Maxwell, P.A. (2009). Cenozoic Mollusca. Pp 232-254 in Gordon, D.P. (ed.) New Zealand inventory of biodiversity. Volume one. Kingdom Animalia: Radiata, Lophotrochozoa, Deuterostomia. Canterbury University Press, Christchurch

External links
  P. Vella, Tertiary Mollusca from Southeast Wairarapa, p. 548 pl. 27 fig.24;, 25; New Zealand Geological Survey, 1953

terrisae
Gastropods described in 1954
Gastropods of New Zealand